Lake Balık ( literally "fish lake"), is a lava-dammed freshwater lake in Ağrı Province, eastern Turkey. It has one of the highest elevations of the country's lakes.

Geography
The lake is situated on the district border of Taşlıçay and Doğubeyazıt in Ağrı Province. The west shore of the lake lies in Taşlıçay and the east shore in Doğubeyazıt. It is  far from Ağrı. Formed by a lava dam, the geology and geomorphology of the lake features characteristics of ophiolite and sedimentary rocks. The lake is fed by a number of creeks from the surrounding mountains and groundwater, and in turn it feeds Gürgüre Creek to the southeast. The lake lies in an area with continental climate. Winters are harsh, and the seasons of spring and fall are short. Precipitation is mostly in the form of snow rather than of rain.

Biota
Particularly the southeast of the wetland is covered with reeds. There are agricultural land and meadows in close surroundings of the lake. The fauna of the lake is composed of diverse bird species. An island of size  in the lake is the nesting area of velvet duck. The lake is also a waterfowl habitat of national importance, however, not under protection. The trout in the lake is consumed as a food and also as a medicine. Observed wildlife in the area around the lake are the bird species eagle, hawk, partridge, wild duck, seagull, quail, woodcock and the mammals hare, fox, wolf.

References

Balik
Landforms of Ağrı Province
Balik
Doğubayazıt
Important Bird Areas of Turkey